Lemvig Basket is a Danish basketball club based in the small town of Lemvig. Founded 10 years ago as an independent club it has steadily improved and is currently the top overall Danish basketball club for both men and women. The ladies have moved up to the Dameligaen (highest level in Denmark) while the gentlemen have, for several years been between among the top teams in DBBF Herrer Div.1 (2nd best level in Denmark). It maintains a high level of internal competition while offering players at all levels an opportunity to enjoy basketball on teams composed of less experienced Danish basketball players for both sexes. The club focuses on giving younger players an opportunity to improve and this principle is strongly supported by its experienced professionals. Lemvig Basket is a very active club in both sports and social aspects of life and is organizing Denmark's largest basketball tournament, The Limfjords-cup.

History

2012/2013 season Men

Depth chart

2012/2013 season Woman

Depth chart

Previous seasons

Limfjordscup
Every year, between 27 and 30 December, Lemvig Basket are hosting Limfjorgscup which is the largest youth tournament in Denmark with 1.500 participants from all over Europe from. In 2011 it will be 20th time the tournament is held.

External links
Lemvig Basket website (Danish)
Results (Danish)
Presentation of men's team (Danish)
Presentation of women's team (Danish)
Dameligaen website (Danish)
Limfjordscup website (English)

Basketball teams in Denmark
Basket